A Place for Lovers is a 1968 French-Italian romantic drama film directed by Vittorio De Sica and written by Brunello Rondi, Julian Zimet, Peter Baldwin, Ennio De Concini, Tonino Guerra and Cesare Zavattini. The film is based on the play Gli Amanti by Brunello Rondi and Renaldo Cabieri and was distributed by Metro-Goldwyn-Mayer.

The film stars Faye Dunaway as a terminally ill American fashion designer in Venice, Italy who has a whirlwind affair with a race-car driver (played by Marcello Mastroianni). It is considered to be one of the worst films ever made.

Plot
Fashion designer Julia is tired of living because she is suffering from malignant cancer. When she leaves for her last holiday in Cortina d'Ampezzo, she meets the vital Valerio. The two fall in love instantly, but Julia does not reveal her secret to Valerio. When Valerio learns that she dying, he pretends to know nothing, continuing the love affair until the end.

Cast
 Faye Dunaway as Julia
 Marcello Mastroianni as Valerio
 Caroline Mortimer as Maggie
 Enrico Simonetti as party host
 Karin Eugh as Griselda
 Esmeralda Ruspoli as attorney's wife
 Yvonne Gilbert as Marie
 Mirella Pamphili as party guest
 David Archell
 Martha Buckman

Soundtrack
Ella Fitzgerald provides two songs: the title song and "Lonely Is." Both songs may be found on the Verve release Jukebox Ella: The Complete Verve Singles, Vol. 1.

Reception
A Place for Lovers opened to generally negative reviews. Roger Ebert of the Chicago Sun-Times called it the "most godawful piece of pseudo-romantic slop I've ever seen!" and Charles Champlin of the Los Angeles Times referred to it as "the worst movie I have seen all year and possibly since 1926." Rex Reed wrote that the film "[l]ooks not so much directed as whittled to death." Time magazine called the film "Woefully inept ... Marcello Mastroianni displays all the zest of a man summoned up for tax evasion. The five scriptwriters who supposedly worked on the film must have spent enough time at the water-cooler to flood a camel." Katherine Caroll's review in the New York Daily News called the film "about as exciting to watch as a game of tiddly-winks." Critic Manny Farber stated that "one of the best laughs is watching Dunaway working on the subject of despair."

The film is widely considered among the worst of all time and was listed in the 1978 book The Fifty Worst Films of All Time, which called the film "a putrid tearjerker." The Italian edition of Vanity Fair included it on its list of the 20 worst films.

See also
 List of films considered the worst
 Cleo from 5 to 7, Agnes Varda's 1962 film that is similar in content
 Italian neorealism
 8 1/2, Federico Fellini's 1963 film featuring Mastroianni

References

External links
 
 
 A Place for Lovers at AllMovie

1968 films
1968 romantic drama films
Italian romantic drama films
French romantic drama films
1960s English-language films
English-language French films
English-language Italian films
1960s Italian-language films
Films directed by Vittorio De Sica
Films about cancer
French films based on plays
Films set in Venice
Films shot in Italy
Films shot in Rome
Melodrama films
Metro-Goldwyn-Mayer films
Films with screenplays by Cesare Zavattini
1960s multilingual films
Italian multilingual films
French multilingual films
1960s Italian films
1960s French films